Potamocorbula is a genus of very small saltwater clams, marine bivalve molluscs in the subfamily Erodoninae of the family Corbulidae  in the order Myida.

Species
The World Register of Marine Species lists the following species:
Potamocorbula adamsi (Tryon, 1869)
Potamocorbula adusta (Reeve, 1844)
Potamocorbula amurensis (Schrenck, 1861)
Potamocorbula fasciata (Reeve, 1843)
Potamocorbula laevis (Hinds, 1843)
Potamocorbula nimbosa (Hanley, 1843)
Potamocorbula rubromuscula Zhuang & Cai, 1983
Synonyms
Potamocorbula abbreviata (Preston, 1907): synonym of Indosphenia abbreviata (Preston, 1907)
Potamocorbula chilkaensis (Preston, 1911): synonym of Indosphenia abbreviata chilkaensis (Preston, 1911)

References

 Habe, T. (1955). Fauna of Akkeshi Bay. 21. Pelecypoda and Scaphopoda. Publications from the Akkeshi Marine Biological Station 4: 1-31, pls 1-7.

External links
 Hallan, A.; Colgan, D. J.; Anderson, L. C.; García, A.; Chivas, A. R. (2013). A single origin for the limnetic-euryhaline taxa in the Corbulidae (Bivalvia). Zoologica Scripta. 42(3): 278-287

Corbulidae
Bivalve genera